Yang Guang (楊 光, born 3 April 1963) is a Chinese hurdler. He competed in the men's 110 metres hurdles at the 1988 Summer Olympics.

References

1963 births
Living people
Athletes (track and field) at the 1988 Summer Olympics
Chinese male hurdlers
Olympic athletes of China
Place of birth missing (living people)